Tradition, Family, Property (TFP) is an international movement of political/civic organizations of Traditionalist Catholic inspiration.

The first TFP was founded by Plinio Corrêa de Oliveira in Brazil in 1960, inspired by his 1959 book Revolution and Counter-Revolution, which became the TFPs' foundational text, later supplemented by his 1993 Nobility and Analogous Traditional Elites in the Allocutions of Pius XII. He remained president of the Brazilian TFP's national council until his death in 1995.

After his death, there was a legal battle upon the title and ownership of the Brazilian TFP, which was ultimately won by João Scognamiglio Clá Dias, in 2004, while he had created previously the Heralds of the Gospel (2001). Those who opposed this action have remained active in the Association of the Founders of TFP and created the Plinio Corrêa de Oliveira Institute.  Both the Heralds of the Gospel and the IPCO claim to be the legitimate TFP. They have taken the legal dispute to the Brazilian Supreme Federal Court. In other countries across the world several organizations have continued to use the name and acronym of TFP, or have adopted other names.  Some of these foreign TFPs are loyal to the Heralds and some are loyal to the IPCO.  Each side will sometimes establish organizations under other names in countries where they do not have the TFP copyright.

Religion, ideology and structure 
The movement has been described as a "Catholic right-wing entity". Its worldview has been characterized as an "extreme moralism, against divorce, against Communism, and against change." Raúl Matta, in L'Ordinaire Latino-Américaine, pointed out that the group's presentation of Catholic tradition is selective, drawing on speeches and encyclicals from the most conservative popes, including the 1864 Syllabus of Errors. The Italian philosopher Rocco Buttiglione noted that members of the TFP movement were among the signatories of the "Filial Correction" of Pope Francis in 2017. The same year a video was made public that showed Cla Dias, the leader of the spin-off group Heralds of the Gospel, ridiculing the Vatican. In 2019 Francis named retired Cardinal Raymundo Damasceno Assis of Aparecida as pontifical commissioner of the Heralds of the Gospel and its religious branches for consecrated men and women.

Löwy's study of the interaction of religion and politics in Latin America used the international TFP to exemplify the most conservative of four tendencies within Latin American Catholicism: the one which "defend[s] ultra-reactionary and sometimes semi-fascist ideas." A recent study pointed out that "TFP draws on a rigid interpretation of Christianity to offer the faithful an all-encompassing ideological justification for what are, in essence, very conservative politics." It has been noted that similar religious movements "are benign compared to Tradition, Family and Property (TFP)" which is also "opposed by the Catholic leadership because of its beliefs and recruiting procedures." Some analysts see it as a fringe group within the Latin American Catholic church.

Institutionally, TFPs have been described as having a "chameleon-like identity". When dealing with the church, they describe themselves as a civic association of the laity, and therefore independent of ecclesiastical control; when dealing with civil society, they stress that they are a voluntary association inspired by religious ideals, and therefore not subject to certain civil regulations such as labor laws.

International expansion and cooperation 
This section will mainly deal with TFP groups organized during Oliveria's lifetime.  For the activities of other TFP groups, see Heralds of the Gospel and Plinio Corrêa de Oliveira Institute for groups aligned with each faction.

TFP is both a national organization and a transnational movement which shares fundamental beliefs, goals, publications, and even funding. Shortly after its foundation in Brazil in 1960, the TFP began a program of international expansion, beginning with a "Latin American Congress of Catholicism" in Serra Negra, Brazil, attended by about 350 Brazilians and about 20 representatives from other countries in Hispanic America. TFP sees this meeting as the beginning of its expansion, with the foundation of TFP offices, national TFPs, and affiliated organizations in 29 countries throughout the world, including Argentina (1967), Chile (1967), Uruguay (1967), Paraguay (1967), Peru (1970), Spain (1971), Bolivia (1973), Colombia (1971), Ecuador (1973), Portugal (1974), the United States (1974), Venezuela (1971), Canada (1975), Italy (1976), France (1977), United Kingdom (1980), Germany (1982), South Africa (1983), Australia (1988), India (1992), Poland (1995), Austria (1999), Ireland (2004), Belgium, Costa Rica, Lithuania, the Philippines, and New Zealand. This expansion produced what is claimed to be "the world’s largest anticommunist and antisocialist network of Catholic inspiration."

Although these TFPs described themselves as "autonomous anticommunist organizations inspired by the traditional teachings of the Popes", they cooperated effectively to advance their social and political agenda. A striking example occurred in 1981 when thirteen TFPs (and related organizations) published a six-page critique by Oliveira of Francois Mitterrand's Socialist government program to implement what was called "self-managing socialism". They were refused space for the essay by six French daily papers but they did publish it in 44 other major newspapers worldwide. The cost of placing each six-page advertisement in The Washington Post or the Toronto Globe and Mail was about $100,000.

Argentina 
The Sociedad Argentina de Defensa de la Tradición, Familia y Propiedad was established in 1967, drawing on a group of conservative Catholics who had previously founded the magazine Cruzada, which opposed liberal Catholicism and socialism. In the late 60s the TFP gained the apparent support of the Argentine military regime when they called for a purge of progressive clergy from the Catholic Church. The publications of the Argentinian TFP have been described as embodying a discourse of violence legitimating the authorities' suppression of civil rights. In 1973 the Buenos Aires provincial police investigated military training activities conducted by the TFP. Around 1976 or 1977 a Father Vicente was forced to flee to Uruguay with the assistance of the Jesuit Provincial, Jorge Bergoglio (later Pope Francis), after having been threatened by TFP for preaching against the murder of three Pallottine priests and two seminarians.

Brazil 
This section is for the historical Brazilian TFP.  For the modern successor organizations, see Heralds of the Gospel and Plinio Corrêa de Oliveira Institute.

The Sociedade Brasileira de Defesa da Tradição, Família e Propriedade was founded in 1960 and flourished during conservative opposition to the land reform proposed in Brazil by the government of João Goulart. Goulart's land reform program was criticized by Plinio Corrêa de Oliveira, the economist Luis Mendonca de Freitas, and reactionary bishops Antonio de Castro Mayer and Geraldo de Proença Sigaud in their 1961 book, Agrarian Reform—A Question of Conscience, which treated private property as a moral absolute. The Brazilian TFP's campaign against what it termed "socialist and confiscatory land reform" provided the incentives leading to the military coup of 1964 as well as later repressive legislation. In 1968 the Brazilian TFP gathered two million signatures on a continent-wide petition campaign against Communist infiltration of the Catholic Church which placed it in clear opposition to the mainstream of the Brazilian hierarchy. TFP also urged the military government to arrest Archbishop Hélder Câmara for his support of land reform. In 1969 Câmara linked the TFP indirectly to the murder in Recife of his aide, Father Antônio Henrique Pereira Neto.

These actions, as well as TFP's opposition to liberation theology, led to a string of criticism beginning in 1970 from a number of bishops, including the National Conference of Bishops of Brazil, which saw the TFP as destroying ecclesiastical unity. Notably, at their 23rd general assembly in 1985 the Brazilian Bishops criticized TFP for its "lack of communion … with the Church in Brazil, its hierarchy, and the Holy Father" and for its "esoteric character, the religious fanaticism, and the cult given to the personality of its leader and his mother." The Brazilian TFP replied the next day that "justice forbids TFP from accepting as valid vague and generic accusations like those in the NCBB text. Specific facts and proofs must be presented." The American TFP attributed the bishops' critique to "the tragic influence of Marxist liberation theology among Brazilian bishops".

The Brazilian TFP split into two factions after the death of its founder in 1995 and a dispute over the rights to the society's name and assets has been progressing through the Brazilian courts. As of 2013 the final decision was waiting on action of the Supreme Court. After the Supreme Court ruled in favor of the Heralds of the Gospel in 2004, the remaining, politically active faction formed the Association of Founders of TFP to continue the original expression of their social ideals and to contest the court case. Since this split, the Association of Founders has received substantial financial support from the American TFP. Subsequently, the Association of Founders of TFP formed a new organization, the Instituto Plinio Corrêa de Oliveira, which carried out much the same program as the original TFP. The Institute's web page provides links to many national TFPs on its list of affiliated organizations and it, along with its periodical Catolicismo, are the two Brazilian organizations listed as an "Inspired and Related Group" on the US TFP's web page.

Chile 
In 1967 a group of conservative Catholics who published the magazine Fiducia, decided to form a Chilean chapter of the TFP. During the late 60s the TFP circulated a book claiming the President, Eduardo Frei Montalva, was the Chilean Kerensky. The book was written in Portuguese by Fabio Vidigal Xavier da Silveira, a director of the Brazilian TFP, translated into Spanish by the Argentine affiliate of the TFP, and distributed in Chile and throughout South America. Vidigal argued that the Christian Democratic party was a tool of the communist plan to socialize Latin America. His book was repeatedly confiscated and the TFP was banned by Frei's Christian Democratic government. They opposed the government of Salvador Allende and welcomed the United States sponsored 1973 military coup that overthrew his Popular Unity government.

In 1976, during the Pinochet dictatorship, the TFP published a book maintaining that Catholics are duty bound to resist pastors and clergy who support the hierarchy, especially the defender of human rights Cardinal Raúl Silva Henríquez, who they said was leading the country toward Communism. The Chilean TFP can be seen as advocating violence against the "enemies of the truth", especially those who were seen as tolerating the infiltration of communism. By March the Chilean Bishops' Conference responded with a formal rebuke of the TFP, maintaining that the bishops have the sole governing responsibility in the Church and that those who participated in this campaign have "by their actions placed themselves outside the Catholic Church". Nonetheless, the TFP continued to have strong influence among the conservative political, military, and economic leadership of Chile, many of whom were present at a 1992 anniversary celebration of the founding of TFP.

France 
The Société française pour la défense de la Tradition, Famille, Propriété grew out of an office established in 1974 by four Latin American members of TFP to disseminate information regarding TFP in Europe. French associates established the Jeunes Français pour une Civilisation Chrétienne in 1975, which took its present name in January 1977. Its statutes set the goals of defending the fundamental principles of Christian Civilization and opposing the principles of liberal and egalitarian revolution and the communism and socialism which that revolution engendered. With its foundation it established a school, l’École Saint-Benoït, which was closed after two years amid accusations that it was being used as a center of indoctrination and recruitment.

The society was described as one of the most active of the pseudo-Catholic organizations by The French Assembly's Commission of inquiry into cults. The Commission defined as pseudo-Catholic those organizations that appeal to the Catholic tradition which they maintain against the reforms imposed by Rome. TFP was also seen to exemplify a mastery of commercial fund-raising techniques, with a network of closely related organizations targeting messages to susceptible recipients. Many critics also come from Catholic circles. For example, in 2006, the Journal chrétien recalled that "the main grievances against the TFP are intellectual swindle, indoctrination, destruction of the followers' personality which are separated from family, cult of the founder, systematic and destructive criticism of all that exists, also about finances". An association fighting against the sects in the Catholic Church, "L'envers du décor", considers the TFP as a cult and accuses it of hiding the past of its leaders as well as the "worship of the founder's personality, mental manipulation, recruitment of young people and other questionable activities that make it look like many modern cults".

Poland 

South Africa 
The Young South Africans for a Christian Civilisation (TFP) was founded in 1984, during the declining years of the apartheid regime, to resist "the liberal, socialist and communist trends of the times" and to provide theological support for the idea of a natural inequality in society. Early targets of TFP's expansion into South Africa were the Catholic, Portuguese speaking, refugees from newly independent Mozambique. One of its activities was to oppose the newspaper, New Nation, which had been funded by the Southern African Catholic Bishops Conference, advanced liberation theology, and opposed apartheid but which TFP saw as "communist inspired". TFP sought to undermine the bishops' popular support and appealed, unsuccessfully, to the Pope that he ban the paper. TFP's efforts were more successful in providing justification for the government's three-month suspension of the newspaper in 1987. The State President and an unnamed government minister wrote the TFP commending them for supporting the goals of the National Party government. The South African bishops issued a strongly worded rebuttal of the accusation that the New Nation was a "communist" newspaper and noted that TFP's critiques ignored the gospel basis of liberation theology.

TFP maintains that they supported the Catholic Bishops' 1952 statement in opposition to Apartheid. They also oppose the excesses of laissez-faire capitalism, but more so the radically liberal and socialist egalitarianism found in Communism which the Catholic Church defines as "intrinsically wrong". TFP favors natural and harmonious inequalities in an organic society.

United States

The American Society for the Defense of Tradition, Family and Property was founded in the United States in 1973, stemming from a group who in 1971 had founded a magazine, Crusade for a Christian Civilization. This drew from earlier encounters of members of the Brazilian TFP with followers of the American New Right. The American TFP is staffed by 75 full-time volunteers and 60 paid employees. Its national headquarters is in Spring Grove, Pennsylvania, with branch offices in McLean, Virginia, Chicago, Illinois, Rossville, Kansas, Lafayette, Louisiana, and Orange County, California.

Its major campaign is America Needs Fatima. Jesuit priest James Martin, referring to the American TFP and to the organization Church Militant, commented that “These online hate groups are now more powerful than local churches”.

A Heralds-aligned TFP group based in the United States, Mary Queen of the Third Millenium, won the right to use the TFP habit over the objections of the American TFP.

References

External links
Society for the Defense of Tradition, Family and Property — Under the control of the Heralds of the Gospel
Instituto Plinio Corrêa de Oliveria (Portuguese) — Under the control of the TFP “Fundadores”

Anti-communist organizations
Catholicism and far-right politics
Catholicism-related controversies
Far-right politics in Brazil
Traditionalist Catholicism
Organizations established in 1960
Catholic advocacy groups
Tradition, Family, Property